The 1972–73 Challenge Cup was the 72nd staging of rugby league's oldest knockout competition, the Challenge Cup.

The final was contested by Featherstone Rovers and Bradford Northern at Wembley.

Featherstone Rovers beat Bradford Northern 33-14 at Wembley in front of a crowd of 72,395.

The winner of the Lance Todd Trophy was the Featherstone scrum-half, Steve Nash.

Cyril Kellett scored 8-conversions for Featherstone Rovers, the most in a Challenge Cup final until it was equalled by Iestyn Harris in 1999.

First round

Second round

Quarter-finals

Semi-finals

Final

References

External links
Challenge Cup official website 
Challenge Cup 1972/73 results at Rugby League Project

Challenge Cup
Challenge Cup